The Schiller STEAM Academy  (also known as Schiller School) in the East Allegheny neighborhood of Pittsburgh, Pennsylvania is a building from 1939. The school is still in use today, as part of the Pittsburgh Public School System, and is known as Schiller STEAM Academy. It was listed on the National Register of Historic Places in 1986.

References

External links
Schiller STEAM Academy - Pittsburgh Public Schools profile

School buildings on the National Register of Historic Places in Pennsylvania
Art Deco architecture in Pennsylvania
School buildings completed in 1939
Schools in Pittsburgh
City of Pittsburgh historic designations
Pittsburgh History & Landmarks Foundation Historic Landmarks
National Register of Historic Places in Pittsburgh